Romanus Frank Nadolney (May 23, 1899 – February 21, 1963), also known as Peaches Nadolney, was a player in the National Football League for the Green Bay Packers and Milwaukee Badgers from 1922 to 1925 as a guard and tackle. He played at the collegiate level at the University of Notre Dame.

Biography
Nadolney was born Romanus Frank Nadolney on May 23, 1899 in Ironwood, Michigan. He died in Houston, Texas on February 21, 1963.

See also
Green Bay Packers players
List of Milwaukee Badgers players

References

1899 births
1963 deaths
American football guards
Notre Dame Fighting Irish football players
Green Bay Packers players
Milwaukee Badgers players
Players of American football from Michigan
People from Ironwood, Michigan